The Congregação Israelita Paulista in São Paulo, is the largest synagogue in Latin America, serving more than 2000 families. Established in 1936 by a group of refugees from Nazi Germany, it is a Reform  synagogue, but also has ties with the Conservative movement.

The rabbinate of the congregation that follows the liberal movements of Judaism (although not only affiliated to the Reform Movement, but also affiliated to the Conservative Movement), - is currently composed by rabbis Michel Schlesinger, Ruben Sternschein, Rogério Cukierman, and Tamara Schagas. There are also the chazanim (cantors) Avi Bursztein, Alexandre Edelstein, and Alexandre Schinazi.

Because CIP is known for being the largest Jewish congregation in Latin America, in membership, they promote a diverse number of activities: religious services, Jewish study groups, informal Jewish school, choir, activities for senior citizens, fields of study, Zionist youth groups (Chazit Hanoar), Boy Scouts and  Girl Guides (in Avanhandava), distinguishing itself positively in São Paulo's Jewish community which is estimated at ninety eight thousand Jews.

Activism 
The congregation has also historically engaged in several types of political activism. In her history of the congregation, Maria Luiza Tucci Carneiro of the University of Sao Paolo said that the congregation "is seen as a space of resistance and memory because it initially welcomed German Jews, persecuted by Nazism, and later Italian Jews, persecuted by fascism. Then a resistance nucleus emerged that left a very important legacy in Brazilian culture". Following the death of Jewish journalist Vladimir Herzog during the Military dictatorship in Brazil in the 1970s, the congregation's chief rabbi Henry Sobel stood with interfaith leaders to denounce Herzog's murder by security forces.

Leadership 

Rabbi Michel Schlesinger
Rabbi Ruben Sternschein

Rabbi Rogério Cukierman
Rabbi Tamara Schagas

References

External links
Official site

1936 establishments in Brazil
Ashkenazi Jewish culture in Brazil
Ashkenazi synagogues
Conservative Judaism in Brazil
Conservative synagogues
Reform synagogues in Brazil
Jewish organizations established in 1936
Religious buildings and structures in São Paulo
German-Brazilian culture
German-Jewish diaspora